T2 is an American social media company founded by former Twitter employees Sarah Oh and Gabor Cselle. It provides an authenticated network where users can make posts and interact in communities. It is currently in invite-only beta, though the contents on the site are publicly visible.

Background 
Prior to founding T2, Cselle oversaw the incubation of new consumer products in Google’s since-shuttered [Area 120] incubator. Cselle had also been a Group Product Manager at Twitter from 2014-2016, where he worked on the consumer product, and relaunched Twitter’s logged-out homepage and mobile trends. Oh had previously worked as an executive in Trust and Safety at Twitter and Facebook. Cselle announced the development of T2 in November 2022.

Platform 
The company has stated the platform’s name is not final and subject to change.

T2 is one of several social media platforms conceived as an alternative to Twitter after Twitter’s takeover by Elon Musk. T2 allows 280 characters on user posts.
Cselle has expressed a desire to keep the platform as similar to the original Twitter platform as possible. T2 also emphasizes security and safety features such as user authentication.

External Links 

 Official T2 Website

References 

American social networking mobile apps
American social networking websites
Real-time web
Text messaging
Microblogging services